The Beilstein Journal of Organic Chemistry is a peer-reviewed open-access scientific journal established in 2005. It is published by the Beilstein Institute for the Advancement of Chemical Sciences, a German non-profit foundation. The editor-in-chief is Peter Seeberger (Max Planck Institute of Colloids and Interfaces).

According to the Journal Citation Reports, the journal has a 2020 impact factor of 2.88.

Scientific videos are available for selected articles of the journal.

References

External links 
 

Organic chemistry journals
Open access journals
Creative Commons Attribution-licensed journals
Publications established in 2005
English-language journals
BioMed Central academic journals